Pireneitega garibaldii is a species of araneomorph spiders found in Italy.

References 

Agelenidae
Spiders of Europe
Endemic arthropods of Italy
Spiders described in 1969